Graham Ward is a drummer, arranger, writer & record producer. He has played & toured with Paul McCartney, Elaine Paige, Paul Young, The Pussycat Dolls, Tom Jones 
, Murray Head, and Nick Heyward, Fred Durst, The Wu-Tang Clan, Tokyo Hotel, N8N. He has lived in London, L.A and is currently based in Cape Town where he runs is own production company: Wardwide-Music.

Career In 1983, on which he played drums on the album "Stages" by Elaine Paige, he would later perform on three other albums with her, and in 1986, he performed on former Beatle, Paul McCartney's "Press to Play". He also performed on the album "Other Voices" by Paul Young, and he also performed on "Doll Domination" by The Pussycat Dolls.

Graham currently resides in Cape Town, South Africa, and works under his own audio production company by the name of Wardwide Music.

References

American drummers
Living people
Year of birth missing (living people)